Om Gurung (11 February 1953 – 17 October 2022) was a Nepalese sociologist who was head of the Central Department of Sociology/Anthropology of the Tribhuvan University of Nepal. He also served as the chairman of the Nepal Federation of Indigenous Nationalities (NEFIN)—the umbrella organization of various Indigenous groups in the country—and has been actively involved in indigenous identity politics. At one stage, he was suffering from severe kidney failure. Doctors suggested transplanting his kidney as soon as possible but at first there was a lack of potential compatible donor. Then it was transplanted about a decade ago.

Gurung died from cancer in Lalitpur District, Nepal, on 17 October 2022, at the age of 69.

References

1953 births
2022 deaths
Nepalese sociologists
Academic staff of Tribhuvan University
Gurung people
Deaths from cancer in Nepal